Runyon is a very small housing area with rental apartments (Alston Management, Inc).
Runyon was previously owned by U.S. Sugar. It is located approximately a half mile north of Hooker highway, diagonally adjacent to Palm Beach County west area jail.

Roads
N Main St
Livestock Market Rd.
Church St.
Bamboo St.
Port Royal Ave.
Orange Blossom Ln. 
St Elizabeth Ave.
Pkwy Ave.
Oak Ln.
Runyon Village 
441

Churches
Straightway Church of Christ Written In Heaven

Schools
No schools.

References

Unincorporated communities in Palm Beach County, Florida
Unincorporated communities in Florida